Balawaristan, meaning the 'country of heights', is a name used by the Gilgit-Baltistan people to refer to their region. The term was coined by the Pakistani political party Balawaristan National Front, founded by Nawaz Khan Naji, in 1989. But it has its roots in the historical names Bolor or Boloristan, with documented usage in Chinese sources from the 8th century AD. According to the present day activists, 'Balawaristan' includes Chitral, Gilgit, Skardu, Hunza, Nagar, Ishkoman, Punial and Yasin (see Districts of Gilgit-Baltistan). The leader of BNF Nawaz Khan Naji declared that Balawaristan (Gilgit-Baltistan) is not a part of Kashmir region.

Etymology
Balors means "highlanders", it is believed to have come from "Bala" meaning high or upper. Thus it means land of highlanders.

Historically, the Baltistan region was called "Great Bolor" and Dardistan and parts of Brooshal (e.g. Gilgit Valley) were called "Little Bolor."
Great Boloristan is known to have sent ambassadors to the Chinese court in the 8th century. The Mons, an Indo-Aryan group, made the region as a hub of Buddhism.

Chinese historian Faxian mentioned it as Pololo or Palolo, Tibetans called it Nang-khod, where Arab historians mentioned it as Baloristan, moreover Theodre Foster in his The London Quarterly Review has stated that to Muslim geographers the name of the region was not known, use of the name in very rare cases is found. Phunchok Stobdan says Mughal historian called it Tibet-i-Khurd.
The people of this region though belonging to various ethnicities, have historically been referred to as Balors, which means the highlanders or mountain people, a reference to the high-altitudes prevalent in this area. An alternative theory links the name to a mythic ancient king called Bolor Shah, who had first united the region and from whom local rulers in turn often claimed descent.

Political status movements

In more recent times, the name Balawaristan is found used by Gilgiti political party like Balawaristan National Front led by Nawaz Khan Naji. The party is seeking to declare Gilgit-Baltistan a province of Pakistan. It also wants to give the people of Gilgit Baltistan representation in the Pakistani National Assembly and Senate, and to extend the jurisdiction of the Supreme Court to the region. The party has been represented in the Gilgit-Baltistan Legislative Assembly by a single member, the aforementioned Nawaz Khan Naji, since 2011.

Some Balawari groups, such as the Gilgit-Baltistan United Movement, have limited their demands to total autonomy and a respect for their distinctiveness.

Education 
The Balawaristan National Students Organisation, in April 2008, raised a demand for Balawaristan to be constituted into the fifth province of Pakistan (the other four are Punjab, Sindh, Balochistan and Khyber Pakhtunkhwa).

See also
 Bolor-Tagh
 Baltistan
 Gilgit Agency
 Gilgit-Baltistan United Movement
 Insurgency in Jammu and Kashmir
 Karakoram Province
 Nagar

References

Bibliography
 
 

Regions of Pakistan
Politics of Pakistan
Regions of Gilgit-Baltistan
History of Gilgit Agency
History of Gilgit-Baltistan